is a Japanese actress and fashion model.

Career
Starting as a model in Naha, Okinawa, Nikaidō made her film debut in 2009 in Toad's Oil, directed by Kōji Yakusho. She and Shota Sometani received the Marcello Mastroianni Award for Best Young Actor and Actress Award for their work in Shion Sono's Himizu at the 68th Venice International Film Festival in 2011. In 2014, she was introduced in Variety as an "Int'l Star You Should Know"  and New York Asian Film Festival awarded her as an "International Rising Star".

Filmography

Film
Sorasoi (2009)
Toad's Oil (2009)
Ringing in Their Ears (2011) - Michico Narita
Looking for a True Fiancee (2011), Emi
Himizu (2011), Keiko Chazawa
The Warped Forest (2011)
The Boy Inside (2012), Kie
Lesson of the Evil (2012), Reika Katagiri
Brain Man (2013), Noriko Midorikawa
Why Don't You Play in Hell? (2013), Michico
Mourning Recipe (2013), Imo
My Man (2014), Hana Kusarino
The World of Kanako (2014)
Au revoir l' ete (2014), Noriko
Hibi Rock (2014), Saki Utagawa
Farewell, Money (2015)
Misono Universe (2015)
This Nation's Sky (2015), Satoko
Bitter Honey (2016), Akago
Wolf Girl and Black Prince (2016), Erika Shinohara
Kako: My Sullen Past (2016), Kako
Someone (2016), Rika
Scoop! (2016), Nobi Namekawa
Inuyashiki (2018), Shion Watanabe
River's Edge (2018), Haruna Wakakusa
Fly Me to the Saitama (2019), Momomi Dan'noura
Tezuka's Barbara (2019), Barbara
No Longer Human (2019), Tomie Yamazaki
Little Miss Period (2019)
Threads: Our Tapestry of Love (2020), Toshiko Yamada
What to Do with the Dead Kaiju? (2022), Sayoko
Fly Me to the Saitama II (2023), Momomi Dan'noura

Dramas
Atami no Sousakan (TV Asahi, 2010), Remi Amari
The Tempest (NHK, 2011), Omoedo
Future Diary (Fuji TV, 2012), Megumi Fuwa
Taira no Kiyomori (NHK, Taiga Drama, 2012), Taira no Tokuko
Woman: My Life for My Children  (NTV, 2013), Shiori Uesugi
Gunshi Kanbei (NHK, Taiga Drama, 2014), Lady Chacha
Henshin (Wowow, 2014), Megumi Hamura
A Far Promise ~ The Children Who Became Stars (TBS, 2014) 
Mondai no Aru Restaurant (Fuji TV, 2015), Yumi Nitta
Lost ID (NTV, 2016), Sanae Kuramoto
Teacher Gappa (NTV, 2016), Aiko Muramoto
Shiawase no Kioku (TBS-MBS, 2017), Fuyuka Tsushima
Sumu Sumu (NTV-Hulu, 2017), Fumi Nikaido
Frankenstein's Love (NTV, 2017), Tsugumi Tsuguru
Detective Yugami episode 9 (Fuji TV, 2017), Haruna Ishizaki
Segodon (NHK, Taiga Drama, 2018), Aikana
In This Corner of the World (TBS, 2018), Rin Shiraki
Strawberry Night Saga (Fuji TV, 2019), Reiko Himekawa 
Time Limit Investigator 2019 episode 10 (TV Asahi, 2019), Suzune Asaka 
Yell (NHK, Asadora, 2020), Oto Sekiuchi
Promise Cinderella (TBS, 2021), Hayame Katsuragi
Vivant (TBS, 2023)

Dubbing
The Addams Family - Wednesday Addams
The Addams Family 2 - Wednesday Addams

Others
71st NHK Kōhaku Uta Gassen (2020), the red team captain

Awards and Prizes

References

External links

 
 

21st-century Japanese actresses
Japanese television actresses
Japanese female models
People from Naha
1994 births
Living people
Marcello Mastroianni Award winners